Konstantin Sats (born 28 April 1982 in Partizansky District, Krasnoyarsk Krai) is a former Russian alpine skier who competed in the 2006 Winter Olympics.

External links
 sports-reference.com
 

1982 births
Living people
Russian male alpine skiers
Olympic alpine skiers of Russia
Alpine skiers at the 2006 Winter Olympics
People from Krasnoyarsk Krai
Sportspeople from Krasnoyarsk Krai
21st-century Russian people